Víctor Hugo Círigo Vázquez (born 8 April 1953) is a Mexican politician from the Ecologist Green Party of Mexico (partially affiliated with the Institutional Revolutionary Party). He has served as Deputy of the LVIII and LXI Legislatures of the Mexican Congress representing the Federal District.

References

1953 births
Living people
Politicians from Oaxaca
Party of the Democratic Revolution politicians
Institutional Revolutionary Party politicians
Ecologist Green Party of Mexico politicians
21st-century Mexican politicians
Universidad Autónoma Metropolitana alumni
Members of the Congress of Mexico City
Deputies of the LVIII Legislature of Mexico
Deputies of the LXI Legislature of Mexico
Members of the Chamber of Deputies (Mexico) for Mexico City